Virtuoso is a third-person shooter video game developed by MotiveTime and originally published by Nova Spring and Elite Systems in North American and Europe for the DOS in 1994.

Gameplay 

Virtuoso is a game where the player is a rock musician in the year 2055, who spends his time battling in Virtual Reality.

Ports 
A port of Virtuoso for the Atari Jaguar CD was announced in the January 1995 issue of online magazine Atari Explorer Online and was in development by Williams Brothers Developments and planned to be published by Telegames. It was originally slated for a Spring/Summer 1995 release and later planned for a Q2 1995 release. However, Telegames UK president Pete Mortimer stated in an email exchange with website CyberRoach that work on the port and other upcoming titles from the company for the Atari Jaguar platform were suspended after sales of previous titles published by them were not profitable.

Reception
Next Generation reviewed the PC version of the game, rating it two stars out of five, and stated that "The game is Doom without the first person perspective or any of the fun."

Electronic Gaming Monthlys Seanbaby placed it as number 5 in his "20 worst games of all time" feature.

Reviews
GamePro (Aug, 1995)
Electronic Gaming Monthly (Jul, 1995)
PC Player - Jan, 1995

Notes

References

External links 
 Virtuoso at GameFAQs
 Virtuoso at Giant Bomb
 Virtuoso at MobyGames

1994 video games
3DO Interactive Multiplayer games
Cancelled Atari Jaguar games
Data East video games
DOS games
Music video games
Single-player video games
Third-person shooters
Vic Tokai games
Video games developed in the United Kingdom
Video games set in the 2050s
Video games set on Mars
Video games with digitized sprites